The Dangerous Age is a 1923 American silent drama film directed by John M. Stahl and written by J.G. Hawks, Bess Meredyth, and Lenore Coffee. The film stars Lewis Stone, Cleo Madison, Edith Roberts, Ruth Clifford, Myrtle Stedman, and James Morrison. The film was released on February 4, 1923, by Associated First National Pictures.

Plot
As described in a film magazine, John Emerson (Stone), married twenty years, finds that romance and color have left his life. His wife Mary (Madison) fails to sympathize with his longing for some of their previous enthusiasm. While traveling to New York City John encounters and is fascinated by Gloria Sanderson (Clifford). With her he makes the fiddy rounds of Gotham's cabarets. He tells her that he is not married. Afterwards, he writes to Mary, telling her what happened, and that he does not intend to return home. At that moment a wire is on the way to him announcing the upcoming marriage of his daughter Ruth (Roberts). After mailing the letter his fancy for Gloria receives a decided check when he finds her in the arms of another man. She tells him that she did not believe he was serious in his lovemaking, so a much agitated John heads for home. He wants to intercept the fatal letter, so he drives after and boards the train, incidentally wrecking his automobile. He arrives home just in time for his daughter's wedding. Meanwhile, Mary has realized her error towards John and he finds her changed for the better. His one desperate thought is to retain her love and prevent his letter from reaching her. However, she obtains the letter and reads it, but keeps this knowledge from her husband. She says she has not received it and asks what its contents are. John hastily improvises an affectionate epistle and Mary is content, knowing his spoken words are true.

Cast       
Lewis Stone as John Emerson
Cleo Madison as Mary Emerson
Edith Roberts as Ruth Emerson
Ruth Clifford as Gloria Sanderson
Myrtle Stedman as Mrs. Sanderson
James Morrison as Bob
Helen Lynch as Bebe Nash
Lincoln Stedman as Ted
Edmund Burns as Tom 
Richard Tucker as Robert Chanslor
Sidney Algier
Maxine Tabnac as Child (uncredited)

References

External links

Poster at silenthollywood.com

1923 films
1920s English-language films
Silent American drama films
1923 drama films
First National Pictures films
Films directed by John M. Stahl
American silent feature films
American black-and-white films
1920s American films